The You River is the largest tributary of the Yuan River, one of main rivers in the Wuling Mountains in Southwest China. Its other name is Gengshi River; it was called Youxi River in ancient times. Its trunk stream flows through Hubei, Chongqing and Hunan, and its drainage basin reaches into Guizhou.

The valley of the You River was home of the ancient Ba people, the ancestors of the Tujia people.  The You River basin is one of the birthplaces of Chinese civilization: the Qin Dynasty Bamboo Slips of Liye and the Tusi Sites of Laosicheng and Tangya were discovered in the region.

Headwaters
The You River has two headstreams, the north and south sources. The north source, the Beihe River is the main stream; it originates in the Qizimei Mountains in Xuan'en County of Hubei. The south source, commonly named Meijiang River or Xiushan River originates in Shanyangxi of Songtao County, Guizhou. The Meijiang River merges into the main stream at Liangjiangkou of Shiti Town in Xiushan County of Chongqing. 

The upper section of the main stream of the You River is named the Baishui River. It rises in the Qizimei Mountains of Yangliuhzhai Village in Chunmuying Township, Xuan'en.

References

Rivers of Hunan
Rivers of Chongqing
Rivers of Hubei